Ruben van der Meer (born 2 June 1970) is a Dutch actor and comedian.

Career

Music 

Van der Meer became known as one of the members of the band Hakkûhbar.

Film 

In 2019, he played a role in Amsterdam Vice (Baantjer: Het Begin) by Arne Toonen. The film won the Golden Film award two weeks later after having sold 100,000 tickets.

Television 

Between 2004 and 2008 he formed part of the core team of comedians in the television show De Lama's, together with Ruben Nicolai, Tijl Beckand and Jeroen van Koningsbrugge. The show is a Dutch adaptation of the show Whose Line Is It Anyway?. The show was very popular and won the Gouden Televizier-ring in 2006, a prestigious Dutch television award.

In 2009, he presented the show Budget TV together with Ruben Nicolai and Tijl Beckand.

Between 2010 and 2015 he took part in the TV show Echt Waar?! together with Tijl Beckand. The host of this show was Jack Spijkerman.

Selected filmography 

 1999: Jesus is a Palestinian
 2005: Schnitzel Paradise
 2007: Love is All
 2015: J. Kessels
 2019: Amsterdam Vice (Baantjer: Het Begin)

References

External links 
 

1970 births
Living people
20th-century Dutch male actors
21st-century Dutch male actors
Dutch male film actors
Dutch male television actors
Dutch male comedians